Jean-Pierre Le Roux (born 18 May 1982) is a French chess player. He was awarded a grandmaster title in 2010, an International master in 2004 and a FIDE master in 2003 from FIDE. He is ranked 16th in France. He won the 43rd Guernsey International Chess Festival in 2017 and the French rapid chess championship in 2018.

References

External links

1982 births
Living people
Chess grandmasters
French chess players
People from Guingamp
Sportspeople from Côtes-d'Armor